Pedro Juan Capó was Mayor of Ponce, Puerto Rico, from September 1856 to December 1856.

Biography
Capó was one of the major landlords in the municipality of Santa Isabel. In Santa Isabel, Capó owned both lands and the slaves to work them. He owned hacienda El Destino (The Destiny), one of the few haciendas which, as of 2008, still existed in good condition.  The hacienda is located in Santa Isabel's barrio Jauca.

References

See also

List of Puerto Ricans
List of mayors of Ponce, Puerto Rico

Year of birth missing
Year of death missing
Puerto Rican people of Catalan descent
Mayors of Ponce, Puerto Rico